Eisenhart is a surname. Notable people with the surname include:

Churchill Eisenhart, American mathematician
Jake Eisenhart, American pitcher in Major League Baseball
Luther P. Eisenhart, American mathematician
Taylor Eisenhart, American cyclist
Willy Eisenhart, American art writer
20136 Eisenhart, an asteroid